The Aeroplane Flies High is a five-disc box set released by American alternative rock band The Smashing Pumpkins in 1996. It contains expanded versions of the five singles from their album Mellon Collie and the Infinite Sadness and also included a 44-page booklet with pictures and writings by the band's lead singer Billy Corgan, as well as lyrics. A limited edition release, the box reached number 42 on the Billboard charts. Originally intended to be limited to 200,000 copies, Virgin Records produced more after the original run sold out due to overwhelming and unexpected demand.  The album was remastered in 2013 under the supervision of frontman Billy Corgan and reissued on vinyl and as a CD/DVD box set.

Reception 

According to Tom Moon, writing for Rolling Stone, "Aeroplane is the Pumpkins’ Anthology 1, a cutting-room-floor companion piece to Mellon Collie that provides insight into Corgan's extraordinary creative outbursts. He has said that Mellon Collie was a transforming experience for the band, and Aeroplane shows how much the Pumpkins are still willing to take chances. And here's the scary part: There is no filler here. These supposedly second-string tracks are keepers. Aeroplane has its indulgent moments; the very exercise of anthologizing this material is megalomaniacal. But the ballads are as gorgeous as anything Corgan has ever written. The box also has small, ruminative pieces that are jarringly thoughtful and blasts of guitar riffage straight outta the corporate-rock ’70s."

Deluxe release 

In 2013, the Smashing Pumpkins issued a 6-disc deluxe version of The Aeroplane Flies High, which Spotify classified under the band's "compilations" section. According to Ian Cohen, writing for Pitchfork, "[t]he Aeroplane Flies High is not a beloved obscurity, nor is it a canonical album celebrating a milestone anniversary. It’s not even an album: it’s a widely available, 16-year old collection of B-sides from a double album. Granted, the Smashing Pumpkins' Mellon Collie and the Infinite Sadness was more judiciously edited than the title would lead you to believe. It was a 28-song double album all the same, and now Aeroplane nearly quadruples in size with 90 additional tracks on top of its original 33, with a bonus DVD to boot."

Track listing 

The "Pastichio Medley" is a medley of riffs from a variety of sources recorded after Siamese Dream and before the completion of Mellon Collie and the Infinite Sadness. It features "The Demon", "Thunderbolt", "Dearth", "Knuckles", "Star Song", "Firepower", "New Waver", "Space Jam", "Zoom", "So Very Sad About Us", "Phang", "Speed Racer", "The Eternal E", "Hairy Eyeball", "The Groover", "Hell Bent for Hell", "Rachel", "A Dog's Prayer", "Blast", "The Black Rider", "Slurpee", "Flipper", "The Viper", "Bitch", "Fried", "Harmonio", "U.S.A.", "The Tracer", "Envelope Woman", "Plastic Guy", "Glasgow 3am", "The Road Is Long", "Funkified", "Rigamarole", "Depresso", "The Streets Are Hot Tonite", "Dawn at 16", "Spazmatazz", "Fucker", "In the Arms of Sheep", "Speed", "77", "Me Rock You Snow", "Feelium", "Is Alex Milton", "Rubberman", "Spacer", "Rock Me", "Weeping Willowly", "Rings", "So So Pretty", "Lucky Lad", "Jackboot", "Milieu", "Disconnected", "Let Your Lazer Love Light Shine Down", "Phreak", "Porkbelly", "Robot Lover", "Jimmy James", "America", "Slinkeepie", "Dummy Tum Tummy", "Fakir", "Jake", "Camaro", "Moonkids", "Make It Fungus", "V-8", and "Die".

"Rachel" bears a similar sound to, and is apparently an early version of, the Mellon Collie and the Infinite Sadness song "X.Y.U.". As well, "Disconnected" is an as-yet-to-be-completed instrumental version of "The Aeroplane Flies High (Turns Left, Looks Right)".

A full version of "U.S.A." was released on 2011's reissue of Siamese Dream; full versions of "Feelium", "Knuckles", "New Waver", "Zoom", "Phang", "Blast", and "Speed" were released on 2012's reissue of Mellon Collie and the Infinite Sadness; and full versions of "Milieu", "Jackboot", "Rings", "The Groover", and "Star Song" were released on 2013's reissue of The Aeroplane Flies High.

"Tonite Reprise" is a solo acoustic version of "Tonight, Tonight" with slight alterations to the lyrics. It also appeared on the vinyl version of Mellon Collie.

2013 CD/DVD reissue 
As part of EMI Music's extensive reissue campaign, a special edition of the album was released on 26 July 2013. The 6-CD set consists of the five original EPs, each now with added bonus tracks, as well as an additional CD of live material. In total the discs feature 90 tracks. The package also includes a DVD consisting of a live show in Belfort, France from 4 July 1997. The set was also released on vinyl as a 5-LP box set.

Promotional releases 
To promote the original release of the box set, a four-track CD single was issued by Virgin Records America with customized cover sleeve and CD art.

Personnel 

The Smashing Pumpkins

 Billy Corgan – vocals, guitar, piano, production, liner notes, mixing, illustrations
 James Iha – guitar; vocals on "...Said Sadly", "A Night Like This", "The Boy", "Believe", and "The Bells"; production; engineering; mixing
 D'arcy Wretzky – bass guitar, vocals on "Dreaming" and "The Bells", production, engineering, mixing
Jimmy Chamberlin – drums (except DVD)

 Additional musicians
 Keith Brown – piano
 Bill Corgan Sr. – guitar solo on "The Last Song"
 Dennis Flemion – instruments on "Medellia of the Gray Skies"
 Jimmy Flemion – instruments on "Medellia of the Gray Skies"
 Nina Gordon – vocals on "...Said Sadly"
 Adam Schlesinger – piano on "The Bells"
 Eric Remschneider – cello on "The Bells" and "My Blue Heaven"
 Chris Martin – piano on "My Blue Heaven"
 Jonathan Melvoin – keyboards on CD 6 (Live 1996)
 Matt Walker – drums on DVD

 Production
 Andy Chase – engineer
 John Craig – illustrations
 Pual Eledge – photography
 Flood – production, engineering, mixing
 Jeff Lane – mixing
 Tommy Lipnick – engineering
 Jeff Moleski – engineering, mixing
 Tommy Moleski – engineering
 Alan Moulder – production, mixing
 J. Nicholas – mixing, mixing assistant
 Frank Olinsky – art direction, design
 Neil Perry – mixing
 Claudine Pontier – engineering
 Russ Spice – engineering
 Howie Weinberg – mastering
 Martin White – engineering
 Yelena Yemchuk – photography, "Zero" cover art

Chart positions

Notes 

Albums produced by Alan Moulder
Albums produced by Billy Corgan
Albums produced by Flood (producer)
Albums produced by James Iha
The Smashing Pumpkins compilation albums
1996 compilation albums
Virgin Records compilation albums